Char Khooneh or Charkhooneh (Tattersall) is a 2007 Iranian television sitcom.  It recounts life in the Jamali household and set in the four-unit apartment building they own. A total number of 108 episodes in Friday time 10:00 p.m. were aired.

The Title
The title is a pun: Char Khooneh means "plaid" as well as "four houses."  In the first episode, Mrs. Shokouh Jamali and her daughter Parastoo live in one apartment, one apartment is for Mr. Mansour Jamali when he's in the doghouse with his wife, one apartment is for the Jamalis' daughter Rana and her husband Hamed, and one apartment is vacant.  It is later revealed that the apartment Mr. Jamali stays in really belongs to his son Vahid who is at university abroad in Germany. Later the vacant apartment is occupied by Farzad Paknejad and his father Farokh.

Plot
Mansour works at an Egg and Hen Company where he is gunning for a promotion to manager.  When he finally gets it, he runs into some trouble and is replaced by the boss's nephew Farzad Paknejad, who also begins to rent an apartment from Shokouh.  Farzad and Parastoo begin to develop feelings for each other and later marry.  Parastoo is a third-year psychology major at the local university and likes to try out the things she learns in class on her family.  Rana is a flight attendant, and Hamed is a singer who is waiting to be discovered.  He sings in nearly every episode and eagerly awaits the day that his album will be available and he'll be famous. Nazir Shanbeh is a sycophantic caretaker, who is given the place in the family by Shokouh. He is known for his various comical accents, high pitched screams and crying when not all things go his way. Despite the crazy adventures the characters go through, at the end of the day they are all one happy family who love each other.

Cast
Reza Shafiei Jam - Hamed/char shanbeh
Hamid Lolayi - Mansour
Behnoosh Bakhtiari - Parastoo
Maryam Amir Jalali - Shokouh
Falamak Joneidi - Rana
Mohammad Shiri - Farokh
Asghar Heydari - Moradi
Ardalan Shoja Kaveh - Farzad
Payam Khajooyei
Reza Karimi
Javad Razavian - Nazir Shanbeh
Sahar Valadbeigi - Hengameh
 Hossein Rahmani Manesh

Crew
Director: Soroush Sehhat
Producer: Mohsen Chegini
Writers: Soroush Sehat
Singer: Javad Razavian

References

Iranian comedy television series
2000s Iranian television series
2007 Iranian television series debuts
2008 Iranian television series endings
Islamic Republic of Iran Broadcasting original programming